Nachtflug  is the seventh album by Austrian singer Falco.

In Germany, Nachtflug marked the return of Falco to the album and single charts after four years of absence, during which his only charted singles were seen in his home country of Austria. The single "Titanic" almost reached the top 25 of the Slovakian "Okeychart".

Falco saw success with the single "Titanic" in Austria, peaking at number 3 and staying on the charts for 18 weeks.  The album itself profited from this success and Falco reached Number 1 on the Austrian album charts again, a feat which his previous two full-length albums had failed to achieve.

Despite being a hit in Europe, and although "Titanic" received many prizes, it failed to chart in the United States.

Another single, "Dance Mephisto", also made it to the Austrian charts but only saw minor success. The title track, also a single, failed to chart.

It was Falco's last album to be released in his lifetime.

Track listing 
"Titanic" – 3:35
"Monarchy Now" – 4:12
"Dance Mephisto" – 3:31
"Psychos" – 3:16
"S.C.A.N.D.A.L." – 3:56
"Yah-Vibration" – 3:33
"Propaganda" – 3:36
"Time" – 4:07
"Cadillac Hotel" – 5:07
"Nachtflug" – 3:15

2012 Remaster Bonus Disc:

Dance Mephisto (Dance Mix)3:32
Dance Mephisto (Instrumental Radio Mix)	3:27
Titanic (The English Video Version)	3:41
Titanic (Club Mix - Another Mixz Mix)6:29
Titanic (TV-Mix)4:21
Titanic (Deep Tekno Tranz Mix)6:53
Titanic (Dance Till You Drop Techno - 127BPM)12:32
Titanic (House Vocal)5:45
Titanic (Funky Ragga)6:06
Titanic (Deep Tekno Tranz Edit)4:28
Titanic (Original Remix)4:20
Monarchy Now (Extended Club Mix)5:37
Monarchy Now (Beat 4 Feet Radio Mix)3:53
Monarchy Now (Schönbrunner Flieder Club Mix)5:38

References 

1992 albums
Falco (musician) albums
A&M Records albums
German-language albums